Islam is the largest religion in Turkey according to the state, with 99.8% of the population being initially registered by the state as a Muslim. As much as 90% of the population follows Sunni Islam. Most Turkish Sunni Muslims belong to the Hanafi school of jurisprudence. The remaining 0.2% are Christians or adherents of other officially recognised religions like Judaism. The official number of Muslims include people with no religion; converted people and anyone who is of a different religion from their Muslim parents, but has not applied for a change of their individual records. These records can be changed or even blanked out on the request of the citizen, by filing an e-government application since May 2020, using a valid electronic signature to sign the electronic application. Any change in religion records additionally results in a new ID card being issued. Any change in religion record also leaves a permanent trail in the census record, however, record of change of religion is not accessible except for the citizen in question, next-of-kin of the citizen in question, the citizenship administration and courts.

Turkey is officially a secular country with no official religion since the constitutional amendment in 1928, which was later strengthened and entrenched with wider appliance of laicism by founder Atatürk during the mid ‘30s, all being in-part with the series’ of Atatürk's Reforms. However, currently all primary and secondary schools hold religious teachings as a mandatory subject since 1982, which mostly focuses on Sunni Islam, though other religions are also covered briefly, or in a wider coverage depending on the educational institution.

In these classes, children learn religious history, practices and beliefs which belong more specifically to Sunni Islam. Thus, although Turkey is officially a secular state, the mandatory teaching of religious subjects in grade schools has been controversial and criticized by both the foreign media and Turkish public.

Upon entering high school after 8th grade, religious studies is merged into philosophical studies and is taught as philosophy (Felsefe), which is also mandatory and features more in-depth teachings about other religions, religious or philosophical thinkers, ideas, and beliefs.

In religious schools, known as "İmam Hatips" which came to prominence in the ‘50s, Islam is taught with more inner depth and has required prayer learnings as part of the mandatory subjects.

In private İmam Hatip schools, Arabic may also be taught as a third, second or fourth language after English and of course Turkish. Some of the schools may even hold Quranic teaching lessons as an optional subject, while there other private institutions completely dedicated to religious teachings that offer such.

Its application to join the European Union divided existing members, some of which questioned whether a Muslim country could fit in. Turkish politicians have accused the country's EU opponents of favoring a "Christian club".

Beginning in the 1980s, the role of religion in the state has been a divisive issue, as influential religious factions challenged the complete secularization called for by Kemalism and the observance of Islamic practices experienced a substantial revival. In the early 2000s, Islamic groups challenged the concept of a secular state with increasing vigor after Recep Tayyip Erdoğan's Islamist-rooted Justice and Development Party (AKP) came into power in 2002.

Religious statistics

Although the Turkish government states that about 99.8% of the population is Muslim, academic research and polls give different results of the percentage of Muslims which are sometimes lower, most of which are above the 90% range, but some are also lower. This is especially because of traditional non-Muslim ethnic groups of the country consist about 0.2% of the population.

According to a 2016 poll Ipsos, which interviewed 17,180 adults across 22 countries, 82% of Turkey was Muslim and 7% of those who were interviewed from Turkey followed no religion whereas 6% identified as "Spiritual but not religious".

In a poll conducted by Sabancı University in 2006, 98.3% of Turks revealed they were Muslim. Most Muslims in Turkey are Sunni Muslims forming about 90%, and Shia-Aleviler (Alevis, Ja'faris and Alawites) denominations in total form up to 10% of the Muslim population. Precise numbers are unavailable since Turkey doesn't conduct censuses about religious denominations. Among Shia Muslim presence in Turkey there is a small but considerable minority of Muslims with Ismaili heritage and affiliation. Christians (Oriental Orthodoxy, Greek Orthodox and Armenian Apostolic) and Jews (Sephardi), who comprise the non-Muslim religious population, make up more than 0.2% of the total.

{|class="wikitable" style="margin:0 auto; padding:0; border:3px solid; font-size:90%; float:right; width:100%;"
|-
|+ Situation of religions in Turkey
|-
!  style="text-align:center;  width:30%;"|Religions
!  style="text-align:center; width:10%;"|Estimated population
!  style="text-align:center; ; width:10%;"|Expropriation measures
!  style="text-align:center;  width:50%;"|Official recognition through the Constitution or international treaties
!  style="text-align:center;  width:10%;"|Government Financing of places of worship and religious staff
|-

! scope="row" style="background:#ccf; text-align:left;"|Sunni Islam – Hanafi
|rowspan="2" style="text-align:right;"|more than 85% of the population
|rowspan="2" style="text-align:right;"|No
|rowspan="2" style="text-align:right;"|Yes through the Diyanet mentioned in the Constitution (art.136)
|rowspan="2" style="text-align:right;"|Yes through the Diyanet
|-

! scope="row" style="background:#ccf; text-align:left;"|Sunni Islam – Shafi'i
|-

! scope="row" style="background:#ccf; text-align:left;"|Shia Islam – Alevism
|style="text-align:right;"|from 4% to more than 25 million
|style="text-align:right;"|Yes
|style="text-align:right;"|Only by local municipalities, not constutituonal
|style="text-align:right;"|Yes through some local municipalities
|-

! scope="row" style="background:#ccf; text-align:left;"|Shia Islam – Ja'fari
|style="text-align:right;"|<1 Million<ref>{{Citation |title=Caferilik nedir?  Türkiye'de Şiiler: "Kadın İslam dünyasında hep bir adım geride |url=https://www.youtube.com/watch?v=eKtxBdFfcTA |language=en |access-date=2022-10-13}}</ref>
|style="text-align:right;"|
|style="text-align:right;"|No
|style="text-align:right;"|No
|-

! scope="row" style="background:#ccf; text-align:left;"|Shia Islam – Alawism
|style="text-align:right;"|<1 Million
|style="text-align:right;"|
|style="text-align:right;"|No
|style="text-align:right;"|No
|-

! scope="row" style="background:#ccf; text-align:left;" |Christianity – Armenian Patriarchate of Constantinople
|style="text-align:right;" |
|style="text-align:right;" |Yes
|style="text-align:right;" |Yes through the Treaty of Lausanne (1923)
|style="text-align:right;" |No
|-

! scope="row" style="background:#ccf; text-align:left;" |Judaism
|style="text-align:right;" |
|style="text-align:right;" |Yes
|style="text-align:right;" |Yes through the Treaty of Lausanne (1923)
|style="text-align:right;" |No
|-

! scope="row" style="background:#ccf; text-align:left;" |Christianity – Latin Catholicism
|style="text-align:right;" |
|style="text-align:right;" |
|style="text-align:right;" |No
|style="text-align:right;" |No
|-

! scope="row" style="background:#ccf; text-align:left;" |Christianity – Syriac Orthodox Church
|style="text-align:right;" |
|style="text-align:right;" |Yes
|style="text-align:right;" |No
|style="text-align:right;" |No
|-

! scope="row" style="background:#ccf; text-align:left;" |Christianity – Greek Orthodox Church of Antioch
|style="text-align:right;" |
|style="text-align:right;" |Yes
|style="text-align:right;" |Yes through the Treaty of Lausanne (1923)
|style="text-align:right;" |No
|-

! scope="row" style="background:#ccf; text-align:left;" |Christianity – Chaldean Catholicism
|style="text-align:right;" |
|style="text-align:right;" |Yes
|style="text-align:right;" |No
|style="text-align:right;" |No
|-

! scope="row" style="background:#ccf; text-align:left;" |Christianity – Protestantism in Turkey
|style="text-align:right;" |
|style="text-align:right;" |Yes
|style="text-align:right;" |Yes
|style="text-align:right;" |Yes
|-

! scope="row" style="background:#ccf; text-align:left;"|Christianity – Ecumenical Patriarchate of Constantinople
|style="text-align:right;"|
|style="text-align:right;"|Yes
|style="text-align:right;"|Yes through the Treaty of Lausanne (1923)
|style="text-align:right;"|No
|-

! scope="row" style="background:#ccf; text-align:left;" |Christianity – Armenian Catholic Archeparchy of Istanbul
|style="text-align:right;" |
|style="text-align:right;" |Yes
|style="text-align:right;" |Yes through the Treaty of Lausanne (1923)
|style="text-align:right;" |No
|-

! scope="row" style="background:#ccf; text-align:left;" |Christianity – Syriac Catholic Church
|style="text-align:right;" |
|style="text-align:right;" |Yes
|style="text-align:right;" |No
|style="text-align:right;" |No
|-

! scope="row" style="background:#ccf; text-align:left;" |Christianity – Union of the Armenian Evangelical Churches in the Near East
|style="text-align:right;" |
|style="text-align:right;" |Yes
|style="text-align:right;" |Yes through the Treaty of Lausanne (1923)
|style="text-align:right;" |No
|-

! scope="row" style="background:#ccf; text-align:left;" |Tengrism
|style="text-align:right;" |
|style="text-align:right;" |
|style="text-align:right;" |No
|style="text-align:right;" |No
|-

! scope="row" style="background:#ccf; text-align:left;" |Yazidism
|style="text-align:right;" |
|style="text-align:right;" |
|style="text-align:right;" |No
|style="text-align:right;" |No
|-

! scope="row" style="background:#ccf; text-align:left;" |Christianity – Autocephalous Turkish Orthodox Patriarchate
|style="text-align:right;" |
|style="text-align:right;" |
|style="text-align:right;" |Yes through the Treaty of Lausanne (1923)
|style="text-align:right;" |No
|-

! scope="row" style="background:#ccf; text-align:left;"|Christianity – Greek Byzantine Catholic Church
|style="text-align:right;"|
|style="text-align:right;"|Yes
|style="text-align:right;"|Yes through the Treaty of Lausanne (1923)
|style="text-align:right;"|No
|}

According to a poll made by MAK, which interviewed 5,400 people in face-to-face through the country, 86% of the Turkish population declared they believe in God and 76% declared they believe the Quran and other holy books came through revelation by God.

Another recent poll by OPTİMAR which interviewed 3,500 people in 26 cities, included a question about belief in God and found that 89.5% of the Turkish population believed in God, 4.5% believed in God but did not belong to an organized religion, 2.7% were agnostic, 1.7% were atheist, and 1.1% did not answer.

According to a survey by World Values Survey In 2017 98.0% Identified as Muslims, while 1.2% Identified with no Religion and 0.8 as other.

According to a survey by the pollster KONDA, the percentage of atheists in Turkey has tripled in 10 years and rose from 1% in 2008 to 3% in 2018, the percentage of non-believers or agnostics rose from 1% to 2%, and that 90% of irreligious Turks were under 35 years old. The survey was conducted in Turkey through face-to-face interviews with 5,793 people in their households, in April, 2018 while in 2008 6,482 people were interviewed in face-to-face in Turkey.

Islam

 

Islam is the religion with the largest community of followers in the country, where most of the population is Muslim, of whom around 90% belong to the Sunni branch of Islam, predominantly following the Hanafi fiqh. About 10% of the population belongs to the Shia sects, mostly to the Alevi faith, thought by most of its adherents to be a form of Shia Islam while a minority considers it to have different origins (see Ishikism, Yazdanism). Closely related to Alevism is the small Bektashi community belonging to a Sufi order of Islam that is indigenous to Turkey, but also has numerous followers in the Balkan peninsula. Alawite, which is observed by some ethnic Arabs in southern provinces, and Jafari, which is the traditional sect of ethnic Azerbaijanis, are other sects that have significant population in Turkey. It's hard to estimate an exact number for religious minorities since Turkey doesn't conduct censuses about religious denominations. Although the Shia population of Turkey varies according to different sources from less than %5 to more than %25, ~10% can be taken as a simplistic estimation.

Alevism, which is the dominant sect of Shia Islam in Turkey, is mostly concentrated in the provinces of Tunceli, Erzincan Malatya, Sivas, Çorum, Kahramanmaraş, Amasya and Tokat. Tunceli is the only province of Turkey with an Alevi majority. Ethnic Kurds and Zazas make up a significant share of Alevi population of Turkey, although majority of them are ethnic Turks.

Islam arrived in the region that comprises present-day Turkey, particularly the eastern provinces of the country, as early as the 7th century. The mainstream Hanafi school of Sunni Islam is largely organized by the state through the Presidency of Religious Affairs (known colloquially as Diyanet), which was established in 1924 following the abolition of the Ottoman Caliphate and controls all mosques and Muslim clerics, and is officially the highest religious authority in the country. Shafi'i school of Sunni Islam is the dominant jurisprudence in Turkish Kurdistan.

As of today, there are thousands of historical mosques throughout the country which are still active. Notable mosques built in the Seljuk and Ottoman periods include the Sultan Ahmed Mosque and Süleymaniye Mosque in Istanbul, the Selimiye Mosque in Edirne, the Yeşil Mosque in Bursa, the Alâeddin Mosque and Mevlana Mosque in Konya, and the Great Mosque in Divriği, among many others. Large mosques built in the Republic of Turkey period include the Kocatepe Mosque in Ankara and the Sabancı Mosque in Adana.

Minor religions

The remainder of the population belongs to other faiths, particularly Christian denominations (Eastern Orthodox, Armenian Apostolic, Syriac Orthodox, Catholic and Protestant), and Judaism (mostly Sephardi Jews, and a smaller Ashkenazi community). Today there are between 120,000 and 320,000 Christians in Turkey who belong to various Christian denominations, and around 26,000 Jews in Turkey.

Turkey has numerous important sites for Judaism and Christianity, being one of the birthplaces of the latter. Since the 4th century, Istanbul (Constantinople) has been the seat of the Ecumenical Patriarchate of Constantinople (unofficially Fener Rum Ortodoks Patrikhanesi), which is one of the fourteen autocephalous Eastern Orthodox churches, and the primus inter pares (first among equals) in the Eastern Orthodox communion. However, the Turkish government does not recognize the ecumenical status of Patriarch Bartholomew I. The Halki seminary remains closed since 1971 due to the Patriarchate's refusal to accept the supervision of the Turkish Ministry of Education on the school's educational curricula; whereas the Turkish government wants the school to operate as a branch of the Faculty of Theology at Istanbul University. Other Eastern Orthodox denomination is the Turkish Orthodox Patriarchate with strong influences from Turkish nationalist ideology.

Istanbul, since 1461, is the seat of the Armenian Patriarchate of Constantinople. There have been 84 individual Patriarchs since establishment of the Patriarchate. The first Armenian Patriarch of Constantinople was Hovakim I who ruled from 1461 to 1478. Sultan Mehmed II allowed the establishment of the Patriarchate in 1461, just eight years after the Fall of Constantinople in 1453. The Patriarch was recognized as the religious and secular leader of all Armenians in the Ottoman Empire, and carried the title of milletbaşı or ethnarch as well as patriarch. 75 patriarchs have ruled during the Ottoman period (1461–1908), 4 patriarchs in the Young Turks period (1908–1922) and 5 patriarchs in the current secular Republic of Turkey (1923–present). The current Armenian Patriarch is Mesrob II (Mutafyan) (Մեսրոպ Բ. Մութաֆեան), who has been in office since 1998.

There are many churches and synagogues throughout the country, such as the Church of St. George, the St. Anthony of Padua Church, the Cathedral of the Holy Spirit, the Neve Shalom Synagogue, the Italian Synagogue and the Ashkenazi Synagogue in Istanbul. There are also many historical churches which have been transformed into mosques or museums, such as the Hagia Sophia and Chora Church in Istanbul, the Church of St. Peter in Antakya, and the Church of St. Nicholas in Myra, among many others. There is a small ethnic Turkish Protestant Christian community include about 4,000–5,000 adherents, most of them came from Muslim Turkish background. Around 18,000 Antiochian Greek Christians lives in Turkey, they live mostly in Istanbul, Antioch, Mersin, İskenderun, Samandağ, and in the villages of Altınözü and Tocakli, and the seaside town of Arsuz, As of 2019, an estimated 18,000 of the country's 25,000 Turkish Assyrians live in Istanbul, while the rest live in Tur Abdin. Also, there are around 500 Mormons who live in Turkey.

The percentage of Christians in Turkey fell from 17.5% (three million followers) in a population of 16 million to 2.5% percent in 1927. The drop was the result of events that had a significant impact on the country's demographic structure, such as the Armenian genocide, the population exchange between Greece and Turkey and the emigration of Christians that began in the late 19th century and gained pace in the first quarter of the 20th century. The Wealth Tax on non-Muslims in 1942, the emigration of a portion of Turkish Jews to Israel after 1948, and the ongoing Cyprus dispute, which damaged relations between Turks and Greeks (culminating in the Istanbul pogrom of 6–7 September 1955), were other important events that contributed to the decline of Turkey's non-Muslim population.

The Baháʼí Faith in Turkey has roots in Bahá'u'lláh's, the founder of the Baháʼí Faith, being exiled to Constantinople, current-day Istanbul, by the Ottoman authorities. Baháʼís cannot register with the government officially, but there are probably 10 to 20 thousand Baháʼís, and around a hundred Baháʼí Local Spiritual Assemblies in Turkey.

Tengrism is also one of the small religious minorities in Turkey. The interest in Tengrism, which is the old Turkic religion, has been increasing in recent years and the number of people who consider themselves Tengrists has increased.

A sizeable part of the autochthonous Yazidi population of Turkey fled the country for present-day Armenia and Georgia starting from the late 19th century. There are additional communities in Russia and Germany due to recent migration. The Yazidi community of Turkey declined precipitously during the 20th century. Most of them have immigrated to Europe, particularly Germany; those who remain reside primarily in villages in their former heartland of Tur Abdin.

Irreligion

Irreligion in Turkey is uncommon among Turks as Islam is the predominant faith however some secular officials have also claimed that atheism and deism are growing among Turkish people in recent years.The number of atheists increasing in Turkey According to Ipsos, which interviewed 17,180 adults across 22 countries poll's showed that 82% of Turkey was Muslim and 7% of those who were interviewed from Turkey followed no religion whereas 6% identified as "Spiritual but not religious".

According to a poll made by MAK in 2017, 86% of the Turkish population declared they believe in God. 76% declared they believe Quran and other holy books came through revelation by God. According to another poll made in 2019 by OPTİMAR, which interviewed 3,500 people across 26 cities that 89.5% of those who were interviewed declared they believe in God while 4.5 said they believe in a God but do not believe in a religion. Since there is a great stigma attached to being an atheist in Turkey, many Turkish atheists communicate with each other via the Internet.

Another poll conducted by Gezici Araştırma in 2020 found that across 12 provinces and 18 districts in Turkey with the sample size of 1,062 people stated that 28.5% of Gen Z in Turkey identified with no religion.

Secularism

Turkey has a secular constitution, with no official state religion. Over the course of the 20th century, it developed a strong tradition of secularism similar to the French model of laïcité, with the main distinction being that the Turkish state "openly and publicly controls Islam through its State Directorate of Religious Affairs". The constitution recognizes the freedom of religion for individuals, whereas the religious communities are placed under the protection and jurisdiction of the state and cannot become involved in the political process (e.g. by forming a religious party) or establish faith-based schools. No political party can claim that it represents a form of religious belief; nevertheless, religious sensibilities are generally represented through conservative parties. For decades, the wearing of religious headcover and similar theopolitical symbolic garments was prohibited in universities and other public contexts such as military or police service. As a specific incarnation of an otherwise abstract principle, it accrued symbolic importance among both proponents and opponents of secularism and became the subject of various legal challenges before being dismantled in a series of legislative acts from 2010 to 2017.

Separation between mosque and state was established in Turkey soon after its founding in 1923, with an amendment to the Turkish constitution that mandated that Turkey had no official state religion and that the government and the state were to be free of religious influence. The modernizing reforms undertaken by President Mustafa Kemal Atatürk in the 1920s and 1930s further established secularism in Turkey.

Despite its official secularism, the Turkish government includes the state agency of the Presidency of Religious Affairs, whose purpose is stated by law "to execute the works concerning the beliefs, worship, and ethics of Islam, enlighten the public about their religion, and administer the sacred worshiping places". The institution, commonly known simply as Diyanet, operates 77,500 mosques, builds new ones, pays the salaries of imams, and approves all sermons given in mosques in Turkey. The Presidency of Religious Affairs finances only Sunni Muslim worship in Turkey. For example, Alevi, Câferî (mostly Azeris), and Bektashi Muslims (mostly Turkmen) participate in the financing of the mosques and the salaries of Sunni imams by paying taxes to the state, while their places of worship, which are not officially recognized, do not receive any state funding. The Presidency of Religious Affairs' budget rose from US$0.9 billion for the year 2006 to $2.5 billion in 2012.

Beginning in the 1980s, the role of religion in the state has been a divisive issue, as influential religious factions challenged the complete secularization called for by Kemalism and the observance of Islamic practices experienced a substantial revival. In the early 2000s (decade), Islamic groups challenged the concept of a secular state with increasing vigor after Recep Tayyip Erdoğan's Islamist-rooted Justice and Development Party (AKP) came into power in 2002.

Turkey, through the Treaty of Lausanne (1923), recognizes the civil, political, and cultural rights of non-Muslim minorities. In practice, Turkey only recognizes Greek, Armenian, and Jewish religious minorities. Alevi, Bektashi, and Câferî Muslims among other Muslim sects, as well as Latin Catholics and Protestants, are not recognized officially. In 2013, the European Court of Human Rights ruled that Turkey had discriminated against the religious freedom of Alevis.

With more than 100,000 employees, the Presidency of Religious Affairs has been described as state within the state. Its budget is compared with the budgets of other state departments as such:

 Religious organization 

The mainstream Hanafite school of Sunni Islam is largely organised by the state, through the Presidency of Religious Affairs, which controls all mosques and pays the salaries of all Muslim clerics. The directorate is criticized by some Alevi Muslims for not supporting their beliefs and instead favouring only the Sunni faith.

The Ecumenical Patriarch of Constantinople (Patrik) is the head of the Greek Orthodox Church in Turkey, and also serves as the spiritual leader of all Orthodox churches throughout the world. The Armenian Patriarch is the head of the Armenian Church in Turkey, while the Jewish community is led by the Hahambasi, Turkey's Chief Rabbi, based in Istanbul. These groups have also criticized the Presidency of Religious Affairs for only financially supporting Islam in Turkey.

 Historical Christian sites 
Antioch (modern Antakya), the city where "the disciples were first called Christians" according to the biblical Book of Acts, is located in modern Turkey, as are most of the areas visited by St. Paul during his missions. The Epistle to the Galatians, Epistle to the Ephesians, Epistle to the Colossians, First Epistle of Peter, and Book of Revelation are addressed to recipients in the territory of modern Turkey.

Additionally, all of the first Seven Ecumenical Councils that define Christianity for Eastern Orthodox and Catholic Christians took place in the territory that is now Turkey. Many titular sees exist in Turkey, as Anatolia was historically home to a large Christian population for centuries.

 Religious freedom 

The Constitution provides for freedom of religion, and Turkey is a party to the European Convention on Human Rights.

Turkey has a democratic government and a strong tradition of secularism. Nevertheless, the Turkish state's interpretation of secularism has reportedly resulted in religious freedom violations for some of its non-Muslim citizens. The 2009 U.S. Commission on International Religious Freedom report placed Turkey on its watchlist with countries such as Afghanistan, Cuba, the Russian Federation, and Venezuela. Nevertheless, according to this report, the situation for Jews in Turkey is better than in other majority Muslim countries. Jews report being able to worship freely and their places of worship having the protection of the government when required. Jews also operate their own schools, hospitals, two elderly homes, welfare institutions, as well as a newspaper. Despite this, concerns have arisen in recent years because of attacks by extremists on synagogues in 2003, as well as growing anti-Semitism in some sectors of the Turkish media and society.

Catholic Christians have also occasionally been subjected to violent societal attacks. In February 2006, an Italian Catholic priest was shot to death in his church in Trabzon, reportedly by a youth angered over the caricatures of Muhammad in Danish newspapers. The government strongly condemned the killing. A 16-year-old boy was subsequently charged with the murder and sentenced to 19 years in prison. In December 2007, a 19-year-old stabbed a Catholic priest outside a church in İzmir; the priest was treated and released the following day. According to newspaper reports, the assailant, who was arrested soon afterward, admitted that he had been influenced by a recent television program that depicted Christian missionaries as "infiltrators" who took advantage of poor people.

The Armenian Patriarch, head of the Armenian Orthodox Church, also lacks the status of legal personality (unlike the Ecumenical Patriarch of Constantinople, who has a government-recognized role), and there is no seminary in Turkey to educate its clerics since the closure of the last remaining seminar by the state, as only 65,000 Armenian Orthodox people live in Turkey. In 2006, the Armenian Patriarch submitted a proposal to the Minister of Education to enable his community to establish a faculty in the Armenian language at a state university with instruction by the Patriarch. Under current restrictions, only the Sunni Muslim community can legally operate institutions to train new clergy in Turkey for future leadership.

Patriarch Bartholomew I, most senior bishop among equals in the traditional hierarchy of Orthodox Christianity, said that he felt "crucified" living in Turkey under a government that did not recognize the ecumenical status of Patriarch and which would like to see his Patriarchate die out. The AKP government under Prime Minister Recep Tayyip Erdoğan criticized Bartholomew I, with deputy prime minister Arınç saying that the Eastern Orthodox Church enjoyed their religious rights during the AKP's rule, and foreign minister Davutoğlu saying that he hoped that the Patriarch's remarks had been a "slip of the tongue". In response to the government's criticism, Bartholomew's lawyer said when the patriarchate was criticizing government, he was referring to the state, not the AKP government in particular. Prime Minister Erdoğan said that "When it comes to the question, 'Are you recognizing [him] as ecumenical?', I wouldn't be annoyed by it [this title]. Since it did not annoy my ancestors, it will not annoy me, either. But it may annoy some [people] in my country." The Greek Orthodox orphanage in Büyükada was closed by the government; however, following a ruling by the European Court of Human Rights, the deed to the orphanage was returned to the Ecumenical Patriarchate on 29 November 2010.

Religiosity

In a poll conducted by Sabancı University in 2006, 98.3% of Turks revealed they were Muslim. Of that, 19% said they were "extremely religious", 45% said they were "somewhat religious", and 33% said they were "not very religious" and 3%  had "no religious beliefs". 3% of Turks declare themselves with no religious beliefs.

According to Pew in 2020, 89% of Turks say religion plays an important role in their life (71% very important, 18% somewhat important), and 8% say religion doesn't play an important role in their life (3% not at all important, 5% not too important), 75% of Turks also say it is necessary to believe in God to be moral, compare to 84% in 2002.

According to a poll made by OPTİMAR in 2019 

 89.5 % responded : "I believe in God's existence and oneness." (Theist)
 4.5 % responded : "I think there is a creator, but I am not religious." (Deist)
 2.7 % responded : "I'm not sure if there is a creator." (agnostic)
 1.7 % responded : "I don't think there is a creator." (Atheist)
 1.7 % responded no answer.

According to the Pew Research Center report 2015:

 61 % of people in Turkey say religion is "very important" to their lives.
 22 % of people in Turkey say religion is "somewhat important" to their lives.
 7 % of people in Turkey say religion is "not too important" to their lives.
 3 % of people in Turkey say religion is "not at all important" to their lives.

According to the Gallup Poll 2012:

 23 % defined themselves as "a religious person".
 73 % defined themselves as "not a religious person".
 2 % defined themselves as "a convinced atheist".

According to the Eurobarometer Poll 2010:

 94 % of Turkish citizens responded: "I believe there is a God". (theist)
 1 % responded: "I believe there is some sort of spirit or life force". (spiritual)
 1 % responded: "I do not believe there is any sort of spirit, god, or life force". (neither theist nor spiritual)

According to the KONDA Research and Consultancy survey carried out throughout Turkey in 2007:

 52.8 % defined themselves as "a religious person who strives to fulfill religious obligations" (Practicing religious).
 34.3 % defined themselves as "a believer who does not fulfill religious obligations" (Religious in the name).
 9.7 % defined themselves as "a fully devout person fulfilling all religious obligations" (Fully devout).
 2.3 % defined themselves as "someone who does not believe in religious obligations" (Non-believer).
 0.9 % defined themselves as "someone with no religious conviction" (Irreligious).

 Claims of increasing Islamization 
The rise of Islamic religiosity in Turkey in the last two decades has been discussed for the past several years. Many see Turkish society moving towards a more hardline Islamic identity and country, citing increasing religious criticisms against what is considered immoral behaviour and government policies seen as enforcing conservative Islamic morality, as well as the controversial blasphemy conviction of the pianist Fazıl Say for "insulting Islam" by retweeting a joke about the Islamic Friday prayer. The New York Times published a report about Turkey in 2012, noting an increased polarization between secular and religious groups in Turkish society and politics. Critics argue that Turkish public institutions, once staunchly secular, are shifting in favour of Islamists.

 In education 
The government of Recep Tayyip Erdoğan and the Justice and Development Party (AKP) pursue the explicit policy agenda of Islamization of education to "raise a devout generation" against secular resistance, in the process causing lost jobs and school for many non-religious citizens of Turkey.

In 2013, several books that were previously recommended for classroom use were found to be rewritten to include more Islamic themes, without the Ministry of Education's consent. Traditional stories of Pinocchio, Heidi, and Tom Sawyer were rewritten to include characters that wished each other a "God-blessed morning" and statements that included "in Allah's name"; in one rewrite, one of the Three Musketeers converted to Islam.

 Headscarf controversy 
For most of the 20th century, Turkish law prohibited the wearing of headscarves and similar garments of religious symbolism in public governmental institutions. The law became a Wedge issue in the public discourse, culminating in an early effort to see the law overturned by the Grand Chamber of the European Court of Human Rights failing in 2005 when the court deemed it legitimate in Leyla Şahin v. Turkey.Subsequently, the issue formed a core of Recep Tayyip Erdogan's first campaign for the presidency in 2007, arguing that it was an issue of human rights and freedomsDerakhshandeh, Mehran. Just a headscarf? Tehran Times. Mehr News Agency. 16 February 2008. Following his victory, the ban was eliminated in a series of legislative acts starting with an amendment to the constitution in 2008 allowing women to wear headscarves in Turkish universities while upholding the prohibition of symbols of other religions in that context.Jenkins, Gareth. Turkey's Constitutional Changes: Much Ado About Nothing?  Eurasia Daily Monitor. The Jamestown Foundation. 11 February 2008. Further changes saw the ban eliminated in some government buildings including parliament the next year, followed by the police forces and, finally, the military in 2017.

Restriction of alcohol sales and advertising

In 2013, the parliament of Turkey passed legislation that bans all forms of advertising for alcoholic beverages and tightened restrictions on alcohol sales. This also includes the censoring of images on television, usually implemented by blurring, historically implemented by CNBC-e as flower placement. The law was sponsored by the ruling AKP.

Hagia Sophia conversion
In early July 2020, the Council of State annulled the Cabinet's 1934 decision to establish the museum, revoking the monument's status, and a subsequent decree by Turkish president Recep Tayyip Erdoğan ordered the reclassification of Hagia Sophia as a mosque. The 1934 decree was ruled to be unlawful under both Ottoman and Turkish law as Hagia Sophia's waqf, endowed by Sultan Mehmed, had designated the site a mosque; proponents of the decision argued the Hagia Sophia was the personal property of the sultan. This redesignation is controversial, invoking condemnation from the Turkish opposition, UNESCO, the World Council of Churches, the International Association of Byzantine Studies, and many international leaders.

During his speech announcing the conversion of the monument, Erdoğan highlighted how the conversion would gratify the "spirit of conquest" of Mehmet II, and during the first sermon on 24 July 2020, Ali Erbaş, head of Turkey's Directorate of Religious Affairs, held a sword in his hand, symbolizing a tradition of conquest. This was perceived as a branding of the non-Muslim population of Turkey, especially the Greek Orthodox as "re-conquered subjects and second-class citizens".

Church of St. Saviour in Chora conversion
In August 2020, just a month after the Hagia Sophia, the president of Turkey Recep Tayyip Erdoğan ordered another ancient Orthodox Church, the 1,000 year old Church of St. Saviour in Chora to be converted into a mosque. Similar to the Hagia Sophia, it had earlier been converted from a Church to a Mosque in 1453, and then into a museum known as the Kariye Museum after the Second World War.

 Counterclaims 
Many also see interest and support of secularism in Turkey as increasing, not decreasing. After Erdogan made a statement in January 2012 about his desire to "raise a religious youth," politicians of all parties condemned his statements as abandoning Turkish values. A petition reading "[O]f Muslim, Christian, Jewish, Zoroastrian, Alawite, Shafi’i, religious and non-religious, atheist and agnostic backgrounds, all joined with a firm belief in secularism, [we] find your recent remarks about raising a religious and conservative youth most alarming and dangerous" was signed by over 2,000 people. The pro-government newspaper Bugün ran a story stating "no one has the right to convert this society into a religious one, or the opposite." Surveys of the Turkish people also show a great support for maintaining secular lifestyles. The Turkish Economic and Social Studies Foundation found that only 9% of Turks supported a religious state in 2006. A more recent 2015 poll by Metropoll found that over 80% of Turkish people supported the continuation of Turkey as a secular state, with even the majority of AKP voters supporting a secular state too. Furthermore, according to a 2016 Pew Research Center Report, only 13% of all Turks believe laws should "strictly follow the teachings of the Qur'an."

An early April 2018 report of the Turkish Ministry of Education, titled "The Youth is Sliding to Deism", observed that an increasing number of pupils in İmam Hatip schools was abandoning Islam in favour of deism. The report's publication generated large-scale controversy amongst conservative Muslim groups in Turkish society. Progressive Islamic theologian Mustafa Öztürk noted the deist trend a year earlier, arguing that the "very archaic, dogmatic notion of religion" held by the majority of those claiming to represent Islam was causing "the new generations [to get] indifferent, even distant, to the Islamic worldview." Despite lacking reliable statistical data, numerous anecdotes appear to point in this direction. Although some commentators claim the secularisation is merely a result of Western influence or even a "conspiracy", most commentators, even some pro-government ones, have come to conclude that "the real reason for the loss of faith in Islam is not the West but Turkey itself: It is a reaction to all the corruption, arrogance, narrow-mindedness, bigotry, cruelty and crudeness displayed in the name of Islam." Especially when the AKP Islamists are in power to enforce Islam upon society, this is making citizens turn their back on it.

 See also 

 
 Christianity in Turkey
 Armenian Patriarchate of Constantinople
 Greek (Ecumenical) Patriarchate of Constantinople
 Protestantism in Turkey
 Catholic Church in Turkey
 Turkish Orthodox Patriarchate
 Baháʼí Faith in Turkey
 Cultural Muslim
 Islam in Turkey
 Alevism
 Bektashism
 Judaism in Turkey
 Headscarf controversy in Turkey
 Mersin Interfaith Cemetery
 Religion by country
 Tengrism
 Yazidis in Turkey
 Buddhism in Turkey
 Hinduism in Turkey
 List of mosques in Turkey
 List of synagogues in Turkey

References

Further reading

 Altınlı-Macić, M., & Coleman, T. J. III, (2015). Spirituality and Religion: An Empirical Study Using a Turkish Muslim Sample. In Z. Agilkaya-Sahin, H. Streib, A. Ayten & R. Hood (Eds.), Psychology of Religion in Turkey (pp. 161–176). Leiden: Brill. doi: 10.1163/9789004290884_008
Peker, E. 2020. "Beyond Positivism: Building Turkish Laiklik in the Transition from the Empire to the Republic (1908–38)." Social Science History''
 

 
Demographics of Turkey